Pereslegino is a village in Velikoluksky District of Pskov Oblast, Russia.

Rural localities in Pskov Oblast
Velikoluksky District